Althea Willoughby (1904–1982) was a British artist. She worked as a book and magazine illustrator, painted decorative tiles and made wood engravings.

Biography
Willoughby was born in London. Her mother, Vera Willoughby was also a professional illustrator and her father was the actor Lewis Willoughby.

Willoughby was educated at the Royal College of Art during the 1920s. Her work was exhibited at the Redfern Gallery in 1930 and at The British Art in India exhibition of 1935.

Willoughby designed the woodcut frontispiece for Alexander Somerton's The Glades of Glenbella (1929) and illustrated three volumes of Faber and Faber's Ariel Poems: James Stephens' The Outcast (1929), D. H. Lawrence's The Triumph of the Machine (1930), and Henry Newbolt's A Child is Born (1931) She designed posters for London Transport, including Chrysanthemums in London's Parks (1933), and for the Southern Railway. She also designed patterned papers for the Curwen Press.

After marriage, Willoughby was known as Althea Wolton.

Her work is in collections including the Olga Hirsch Collection of Decorated Papers at the British Library, and that of the Victoria and Albert Museum.

References

External links 
 Cover of the 1936 Christmas edition of the Radio Times, by Willoughby

1904 births
1982 deaths
20th-century English women artists
Alumni of the Royal College of Art
Artists from London
English illustrators